Haphazard is a historic house located on Pleasant Valley Road in Owensboro, Kentucky. The house overlooks the Ohio River, and its name is probably derived from the river's eddies. The property which Haphazard was built on was originally owned by George Mason, a signatory to the U.S. Constitution, who was given the land in a grant surveyed in 1787. Mason's grandson Richard sold the property to Robert Triplett in 1822, by which point the log house forming the central portion of the home had been built. Triplett likely added the house's side wings, northern gable, and Federal style interior. Triplett accomplished many local firsts, as he was Owensboro's first large real estate dealer; Daviess County's first soil conservationist, barge operator, and author; the first distiller on the Ohio River in the county; and the builder of Kentucky's first railroad. In 1843, A. B. Barret purchased the house from Triplett; Barret then sold the house to William Bell the following year. Bell, the president of a local bank, likely added the house's Greek Revival portico.

The house was added to the National Register of Historic Places on August 22, 1975.

References

Houses on the National Register of Historic Places in Kentucky
Federal architecture in Kentucky
Greek Revival houses in Kentucky
Buildings and structures in Owensboro, Kentucky
National Register of Historic Places in Daviess County, Kentucky